is a very small asteroid classified as a near-Earth object that passed within  of the surface of Earth on July 28, 2020, with a fly-by speed of  per second.

The asteroid was discovered July 26, 2020 using the Mount Lemmon Survey telescope in the Santa Catalina Mountains northeast of Tucson, Arizona.

References

External links 
 
 
 

Minor planet object articles (unnumbered)
Discoveries by MLS
20200728
20200726